Who Controls the Internet? Illusions of a Borderless World is a 2006 book by Jack Goldsmith and Tim Wu that offers an assessment of the struggle to control the Internet. Starting with a discussion of the early vision of a borderless global community, the authors present some of the most prominent individuals, ideas and movements that have played key roles in developing the Internet. As law professors at Harvard and Columbia, respectively, Goldsmith and Wu assert the important role of government in maintaining Internet law and order while debunking the claims of techno-utopianism that have been espoused by theorists such as Thomas Friedman.

Goldsmith and Wu conclude that the importance of governmental coercion on the Internet has been seriously underestimated, writing that "the failure to understand the many faces and facets of territorial governmental coercion is fatal to globalization theory as understood today, and central to understanding the future of the Internet" (184).

Overview
The book has three parts.

Part One: The Internet Revolution
The authors discuss the early days of the Internet through the 1990s, when Julian Dibbell and John Perry Barlow articulated a vision of free Internet that gained wide currency in the public imagination. The Electronic Frontier Foundation worked to protect the Internet from regulation in the belief that a free online community might unite people and eliminate the need for government. Jon Postel was the ultimate authority over Internet domain names.

Goldsmith and Wu describe key changes in control over the Internet that occurred in the 1990s, beginning with consolidation of power by the U.S. Department of Defense (DoD) in the 1990s. A DoD subcontractor called Network Solutions, Inc., became the ultimate authority over Internet naming conventions in 1991. Although Postel remained functionally in control for a few more years, "the transfer of partial authority to Network Solutions was a crucial turning point in Internet history. For the first time, administration of part of the Internet's naming system would be in the hands of a for-profit company" (35).

In 1995, Network Solutions began charging individuals to register domain names. This brought the company, which had a monopoly on issuing domain names, large profits. When the International Ad Hoc Committee, set up by the Internet Society, released an "Internet Constitution" in 1997, they met with hostility from the U.S. government and were ultimately thwarted (41–43).

Jon Postel met an even more direct response when he attempted to retake control over the root naming and numbering system in 1998. Hours after Postel asked eight regional operators for root control over the Internet, he received threats of legal and economic repercussions from federal agent Ira Magaziner. Network Solutions has retained final authority over Internet domain names ever since (44–46).

Part Two: Government Strikes Back

No longer an international phenomenon, the Internet has become quite different for its users in different countries. One reason for differentiation across nations is that users want information presented in their local language and context. Advertisers likewise to present information to interested audiences, which tend to be geographically specific (58–63).

Goldsmith and Wu also describe how governments began to pressure or control local intermediaries in order to restrict Internet content. Examples include:

 Yahoo's forced restrictions on the sale of Nazi paraphernalia in France (1–8)
 Google de-listing Operation Clambake in response to a DMCA filing by the Church of Scientology (75)
 Google de-listing websites devoted to hate speech and Nazi materials in France and Germany (75)
 Saudi Arabia's direct filters, imposed on its ISPs, of websites containing pornography, gambling, interfaith dialogue, and discussions about how to circumvent filtering (74) 
 Elimination of online cigarette sales in the U.S. by threatening credit card companies that facilitated it (76)
 Neutralization of websites through the seizure of domain names in the U.S. (78)
 Direct arrest of individuals involved, e.g., in the case of child pornography in the U.S., U.K., and Canada; and in the case of antisemitism in Norway (79–80)
 The neutralization of HavenCo due to pressure from government on businesses not to cooperate (84-85) 
 Chinese censorship, including complete blocks on many websites from outside China (92–95), targeted and sometimes automated censorship of internal dissent (95–104), and direct arrests of dissidents who contribute to the Internet (87–92).

The authors also describe the U.S. battle between the RIAA and file-sharing services such as Napster and Kazaa. They note the ironies of Kazaa's position: partly in defiance of U.S. law, but partly reliant on it to maintain order internally (117–118). Goldsmith and Wu describe the emergence of Apple's iTunes Store as a legal alternative, made preferable by government enforcement of laws against peer-to-peer file-sharing (118–121). They compare the small number of persistent underground file-sharers to groups of Chinese dissidents talking in obscure code, arguing that these groups do not pose a major threat to the interests of business and government: "Ironically, then the most rebellious filesharing programmers can become handmaidens of the government's will. What secretive darknets do is zone the music world, dividing music consumers on the basis of free time and computer ability" (123).

Part Three: Vice, Virtues, the Future
The authors present eBay as a case study in the usefulness of governments in protecting commerce. They describe how the eBay community, during its small beginning phase, relied on goodwill, public ratings, and mediation to navigate disputes among customers (130–132). As the site grew larger, so did the number of malicious users (132–136). Eventually the site was forced to turn to governments for real law enforcement (136–139). Now, eBay works closely with law enforcements systems in the countries where it operates (143–145).

According to the authors, eBay, the case of an Australian libel lawsuit against a U.S. publisher (147–148), and Microsoft's acquiescence to European Union (EU) regulation of its Passport service (173–177) are examples of how the bordered Internet seeks to protect citizens from harm. They argue that as a communications medium, the Internet is not unlike other technologies that have come before and therefore the Internet is not likely to displace territorial government. Rather, it is more likely, the authors speculate, that cultural and political differences may be leading us into a technological Cold War where the U.S., EU and China develop their own competitive Internet platforms.

Reviews
 This is a book that needed to be written. I like what it contributes to the debate on internet governance. But I do not like what is likely to be its political impact on that debate. … The triumphalism of this book is premature. … –In The New Cyber-Conservatism: A review of Goldsmith and Wu's 'Who Controls the Internet?, by Milton Mueller, Syracuse University 
 In the 1990s the Internet was greeted as the New New Thing: It would erase national borders, give rise to communal societies that invented their own rules, undermine the power of governments. In this splendidly argued book, Jack Goldsmith and Tim Wu explain why these early assumptions were mostly wrong: The Internet turns out to illustrate the enduring importance of Old Old Things, such as law and national power and business logic. By turns provocative and colorful, this is an essential read for anyone who cares about the relationship between technology and globalization. –Sebastian Mallaby, Editorial Writer and Columnist, The Washington Post

See also

Internet censorship
Internet freedom
Internet governance
Darknet
Peer-to-peer
Netocracy

References

Books about the Internet
Internet governance
History of the Internet
Texts related to the history of the Internet
2006 non-fiction books
Domain name seizures by United States